The Dillon Baronetcy of Lismullen, in County Meath was created in Baronetage of the United Kingdom in 1801. It became extinct with the death of the 8th Baronet in 1982.

The baronets also held the title of Baron Dillon, of the Holy Roman Empire, which was granted by Imperial Letters Patent of the Emperor Joseph II dated 4 July 1783. The ancestral motto is Whilst I breathe I hope. Royal Licence to use this title was granted by King George III on 22 February 1784.

Dillon baronets (1801)
Sir John Talbot Dillon, 1st Baronet (1739–1805)
Sir Charles Drake Dillon, 2nd Baronet (died 1840)
Sir Arthur Richard Dillon, 3rd Baronet (died 1845)
Sir William Dillon, 4th Baronet (1774–1851)
Sir Arthur Henry Dillon, 5th Baronet (1828–1852)
Sir John Dillon, 6th Baronet (1806–1875)
Sir John Fox Dillon, 7th Baronet (1843–1925)
Sir Robert Dillon, 8th Baronet (1914–1982); brother of Michael Dillon.

In 1958 Debrett's Peerage listed Michael Dillon, one of the first transgender men to have medical and legal gender reassignment from female to male, as heir to his brother's baronetcy, while Burke's Peerage mentioned only a sister, Laura Maude. The editor of Debrett's told Time magazine that Dillon was unquestionably next in line for the baronetcy:  "I have always been of the opinion that a person has all rights and privileges of the sex that is, at a given moment, recognized."

Notes

References

Extinct baronetcies in the Baronetage of the United Kingdom